The Jackson Park Highlands District is a historic district in the South Shore community area of Chicago, Illinois, United States.  The district was built in 1905 by various architects. It was designated a Chicago Landmark on October 25, 1989.

Boundaries
The neighborhood is roughly bounded by 67th Street to the north, 71st Street to the south, Cregier Avenue to the west, and Jeffery Boulevard to the east. Directly north of the neighborhood lies the 18-hole Jackson Park Golf Course, a part of the Chicago Park District's Jackson Park, the third largest park in the city and home of the World's Columbian Exposition, 1893. To the south lies the former Illinois Central Electric tracks, now operated by Metra Electric.  The Jackson Park Highlands District is surrounded on the west, south, and east by the South Shore community area.

History
The neighborhood was commissioned in the early 20th century. Its initial purpose was as a collection of model homes that would overlook the prized Jackson Park, which had hosted the World's Fair less than a decade prior. The neighborhood featured (and is still present) some of the most innovative concepts of the time, including large front yard setbacks, 50-foot lot widths, underground utilities, and no alleys. When Chicago annexed Hyde Park just in time for the 1890 census (to beat out Philadelphia as the second largest metro-area in the nation), the Highlands were left under governorship of the South Shore area.

At the time of World War II, the neighborhood saw huge loss in residence and a destruction of the area was suggested. With the arrival of the 1970s, the neighborhood again began to rise as a major thoroughfare of South Side luxury. It was designated a Chicago Landmark on October 25, 1989. House prices now range from about $300,000 to $1.5 million.

Notable residents
Notable residents have included members of the Whitehall Family, Jesse Jackson, Ramsey Lewis, Bo Diddley, Enrico Fermi and Gale Sayers.

References

Neighborhoods in Chicago
South Side, Chicago
Historic districts in Chicago
Chicago Landmarks
Populated places established in 1905
1905 establishments in Illinois